Bydgoszcz District (Polish: Rejencja Bydgoska, German Regierungsbezirk Bromberg) was the more northern of two administrative districts of the Grand Duchy of Poznań (1815-1918) (later also called the Province of Poznań (1849-1918)).

Administrative division (in 1897)
 Bydgoszcz District (Rejencja Bydgoska), Bydgoszcz 
(English county name, Polish county name, county town)
(please note that at this time Polish county names were written with capital letters)
 Bydgoszcz City, (Miasto Bydgoszcz), Bydgoszcz
 Bydgoszcz County, (Powiat Bydgoski), Bydgoszcz
 Chodzież County, (Powiat Chodzieski), Chodzież
 Gniezno County, (Powiat Gnieźnieński), Gniezno
 Inowrocław County, (Powiat Inowrocławski), Inowrocław
 Mogilno County, (Powiat Mogileński), Mogilno
 Strzelno County, (Powiat Strzelneński), Strzelno
 Szubin County, (Powiat Szubiński), Szubin
 Wągrowiec County, (Powiat Wągrowiecki), Wągrowiec
 Witkowo County, (Powiat Witkowski), Witkowo
 Wyrzysk County, (Powiat Wyrzyski), Wyrzysk
 Żnin County, (Powiat Żniński), Żnin

The Greater Poland and Kuyavia divisions
Greater Poland (geopolitical division of Poland)
Dukes of Greater Poland (12th-13th centuries)
Poznań Voivodship (14th century-1793)
Kalisz Voivodship (14th century-1793)
Inowrocław Voivodship (14th century-1793)
South Prussia (1793-1806)
Duchy of Warsaw (1806-1815)
Grand Duchy of Poznań (1815-1918)
Poznań Voivodship (1918-1939)
Pomeranian Voivodship (1939-1993)
Reichsgau Wartheland (1939-1945)
Pomeranian Voivodship (1945-1950)
Bydgoszcz Voivodship (1950-1998)
Kuyavian-Pomeranian Voivodship (since 1999)
Bydgoszcz (city)

See also
 Poznań District

Districts of the Province of Posen